Dejan Đokić (born 11 August 1989) is a Serbian former professional basketball player.

Professional career 
A point guard, Đokić played for FMP Reserves, Radnički Basket/Radnički FMP, Crvena zvezda, Vojvodina Srbijagas, ABS Primorje, Zlatibor, Metalac, Patrioti Levice, and Spars Sarajevo.

National team career
Đokić was a member of the Serbian university team that won a bronze medal at the 2013 Summer Universiade in Kazan, Russia. Serbia had a 87–74 win over Canada in the bronze medal game. Over eight tournament games, he averaged 8.5 points, two rebounds, and 3.5 assists per game.

Career achievements
 League Cup of Serbia winner: 3  (with Radnički Basket/Radnički FMP: 2009–10, 2010–11, 2011–12)

References

External links
 Dejan Djokic at eurobasket.com
 Dejan Djokic at proballers.com
 Dejan Djokic at realgm.com
 Dejan Djokic at adidasngt.com

1989 births
Living people
Basketball League of Serbia players
Basketball players from Belgrade
BK Patrioti Levice players
KK Crvena zvezda players
KK Metalac Valjevo players
KK Radnički FMP players
KK Vojvodina Srbijagas players
KK Zlatibor players
OKK Spars players
Medalists at the 2013 Summer Universiade
Point guards
Serbian expatriate basketball people in Bosnia and Herzegovina
Serbian expatriate basketball people in Montenegro
Serbian expatriate basketball people in Slovakia
Serbian men's basketball players
Universiade medalists in basketball
Universiade bronze medalists for Serbia